Rinôçérôse (stylized as rinôçérôse or «rinôçérôse») is a French band founded by Jean-Philippe Freu and Patrice Carrié that mixes rock music and electronic dance music. The duo of musicians also work as psychologists, calling themselves, "Psychologists by day, musicians by night". They compose music in English, French, and German. They are based in Montpellier (Occitanie).

"Le Mobilier" was the single that established Rinôçérôse on the map of international dance music. The song "Cubicle", from their album, Schizophonia, was featured on a television advertisement for Apple's iTunes and iPod. Schizophonia marks a new turning point in the band's music, with a more mainstream rock groove rather than a more ambient electronic sound. Schizophonia also contains an unprecedented amount of vocals compared to previous albums, in which lyrics are used extremely sparingly, or not at all.

The band has released an eponymous greatest hits album, named Rinôçérôse (only differentiated from their first album by the diacritics). Rinôçérôse contains hit singles such as "Bitch", "Cubicle", "Music Kills Me", and "My Demons".

Rinôçérôse released their most recent album, Angel & Demons, in 2017.

Their song "La Guitaristic House Organisation", was featured in the soundtrack of the video game NHL 2000 by EA Sports.

Discography 
Albums
Retrospective (1997)
Installation Sonore (1999)
Music Kills Me (2002)
Schizophonia (2005)
Futurinô (2009)
Angels & Demons (2017)

Greatest hitsRinôçérôse'' (2006)

Singles
 "Inacceptable" (1997)
 "Le Mobilier" (1998)
 "Mes Vacances a Rio" (2000)
 "La Guitaristic House Organisation" (2000)
 "Lost Love" (2002)
 "Cubicle" (2006) No. 40 Billboard Hot Modern Rock Tracks
 "Angels & Demons" (2017)
 "Fighting the Machine" (2017)
 "While My Guitar Gently Funks" (2017)

References

External links 

French electronic musicians
Universal Records artists